CIMY-FM (104.9 MHz) is a commercial radio station in Pembroke, Ontario. Owned by My Broadcasting Corporation, it airs an adult contemporary format branded as 104.9 myFM. The radio studios and offices are in Victoria Center on Isabella Street.

CIMY has an effective radiated power (ERP) of 17,900 watts (34,000 maximum). The transmitter is on Round Lake Road in Pembroke, near the Trans-Canada Highway (Ontario Highway 17).

History
The station was licensed by the Canadian Radio-television and Telecommunications Commission (CRTC) in 2005.

On November 2, 2010, My Broadcasting applied to change the authorized contours by increasing the average effective radiated power (ERP). This application was approved on January 13, 2011.

References

External links
104.9 myFM
 

Imy
Imy
Pembroke, Ontario
Radio stations established in 2005
2005 establishments in Ontario
IMY